Rio 2096: A Story of Love and Fury (Portuguese: Uma História de Amor e Fúria) is a 2013 Brazilian animated drama film written and directed by Luiz Bolognesi.

The film follows important moments in the history of Brazil, narrated by a character who lives almost 600 years ago, seeking for the resurrection of his beloved Janaína, and coming to his current life in the year 2096. It was one of the 19 submitted for the Academy Award for Best Animated Feature in the 86th edition.

Plot
The film is set in four dates in the history of Brazil: 1566, when the country was discovered by the Portuguese explorers, 1825, in events during slavery; 1968, during the high point of the authoritarian military dictatorship, and 2096, when there will be a war over water. The film narrates the love between Janaina and a native warrior who, when dying, takes the form of a bird. For six centuries, the story of the couple survives through these four stages in the history of Brazil.

Cast
 Selton Mello as Immortal Warrior
 Camila Pitanga as Janaína
 Rodrigo Santoro as Piatã / Junior

Accolades

References

External links

 
 

2013 films
2013 animated films
Animated drama films
Brazilian animated films
Brazilian animated science fiction films
Brazilian drama films
Brazilian romance films
Brazil in fiction
Films about Brazilian military dictatorship
Films set in the 1560s
Films set in 1825
Films set in the 1960s
Films set in the 1970s
Films set in the 2090s
Films set in 1972
Films set in 1968
Films set in 1970
Films set in 1980
Cold War films
Films set in the future
Films set in Rio de Janeiro (city)
Indigenous cinema in Latin America
Films set in pre-Columbian America
Annecy Cristal for a Feature Film winners
2013 directorial debut films